Paul Doyle (born 26 September 1984 in Bellshill) is a Scottish football defender.

Doyle came through the Clyde youth system, and captained the Under 18 and Under 19 sides. He made his senior debut coming on as a substitute on the last day of 2002-03 season, in a match against Arbroath. He made eight appearances the following season, mainly as a sub.

In season 2004-05, he was sent out on loan to Montrose for the full season. This move was made permanent in July 2005.

He then spent a year at East Fife, before joining East Stirlingshire in July 2007.

See also
Clyde F.C. season 2004-05

External links

Living people
1984 births
Footballers from Bellshill
Scottish footballers
Montrose F.C. players
East Fife F.C. players
Clyde F.C. players
East Stirlingshire F.C. players
Scottish Football League players
Larkhall Thistle F.C. players
Association football defenders